Nancy Frances Cave (2 March 1896 – 1989) was an English squash player who won the British Open three times in 1924, 1929 and 1930. She was also the runner-up in the championship in 1922, 1923, 1925, 1926, 1927 and 1931. She was one of three sisters that participated in the British Open, her younger sister Joyce Cave also won the title on three occasions and her older sister Margorie Maude Cave competed in 1922. All three sisters were taught by their father Harold Watkin Cave who was a rackets player during the 1880s.

References

External links
Official British Open Squash Championships website
British Open historical data at Squashtalk.com

English female squash players
1896 births
1989 deaths